The Embassy of the Democratic People's Republic of Korea in Moscow (Посольство Корейской Народно-Демократической Республики, 로씨야련방주재 조선민주주의인민공화국 대사관) is the chief diplomatic mission of North Korea in the Russian Federation. It is located at 72 Mosfilmovskaya Street in the Ramenki District of Moscow at the corner of Mosfilmovskaya Street and Lomonosovsky Prospekt.

Since February 2020, the ambassador in Russia is currently Sin Hong-chol.  The previous ambassador was Kim Hyong-jun.

See also 
 North Korea–Russia relations
 Diplomatic missions in Russia
 Diplomatic missions in North Korea

References 

North Korea–Russia relations
Korea, North
Moscow
Korea–Soviet Union relations